"Awit sa Bohol" (Boholano for "Song of Bohol"), also known as the Bohol Hymn, is the official anthem of the province of Bohol in the Philippines.

History
The song was composed by Justino Romea of Loon, a columnist for the Bohol Chronicle and a teacher at the Bohol School of Arts and Trades (now the Bohol Island State University), with Romea also writing the hymn's original English lyrics. Commissioned by Governor Lino Chatto, it was first played on March 1, 1970 by an all-female choir of the College of the Holy Spirit (now the Holy Spirit School of Tagbilaran) as the provincial flag was being raised during the opening ceremony for the East Visayan Athletic Association Games in Tagbilaran, the provincial capital.  Later that year on September 24, 1970, the Bohol Provincial Board passed Resolution No. 215, making the song the official hymn of Bohol.

A few years later, the provincial government launched a competition to translate the song's lyrics into Boholano, with the winning entry being written by lyricist and composer Maxelende Ganade. Ganade's lyrics were subsequently adopted by the Provincial Board with the passage of Resolution No. 151 on September 13, 1974.

Lyrics
While "Awit sa Bohol" has official English and Boholano lyrics, and the song is normally performed in Boholano, the Eskaya cultural minority also have a version of the provincial anthem in their language, Eskayan. However, unlike the English and Boholano versions, the Eskayan version is unofficial.

The lyrics of the song have been interpreted as being a strong statement of Boholanos' commitment to their culture, history and environment.

Performance
Singing "Awit sa Bohol" is mandatory whenever there is an official event being held in the province of Bohol.

In 2017, after noticing that the Department of Education began implementing it in schools, Governor Edgar Chatto mandated the performance of "The ASEAN Way", the anthem of the Association of Southeast Asian Nations, in government offices throughout the province, which is to be performed after "Lupang Hinirang" (the National Anthem), "Awit sa Bohol" and, if so required, the municipal hymn.

References

Bibliography

External links
, produced by Department of Trade and Industry

Regional songs
Culture of Bohol
English-language Filipino songs
Asian anthems
Philippine anthems
National anthem compositions in F major